The Motus MST was a sport touring motorcycle produced from 2014 to 2018 by Motus Motorcycles of Birmingham, Alabama. Motus was the newest motorcycle manufacturer in the United States. Motus' partner in developing the MST was race car manufacturer Pratt & Miller, who were credited with product engineering, development, testing and validation for the MST.

The MST was powered by a 90°  pushrod V4 engine that was mounted longitudinally, with its crankshaft aligned fore-and-aft. This was the first V4 ever used in an American motorcycle.

The prototype was first shown to the public at Daytona Beach Bike Week in March, 2011.

References

External links

Sport touring motorcycles
Motorcycles of the United States
Motorcycles introduced in 2014
Motorcycle manufacturers of the United States